Hopewell (also, Hopewell Crossroads) is an unincorporated community in Wayne County, North Carolina, United States. It lies at an elevation of 174 feet (53 m).

References

Unincorporated communities in Wayne County, North Carolina
Unincorporated communities in North Carolina